Henry Gordon (10 December 1931 – 29 July 2014) was a Scottish professional association footballer. He played in the English Football League for Bury.

Gordon played for Rangers, but signed for Bury from Scottish non-league side Petershill. He played 24 times for Bury over a seven-year period, joining Buxton on leaving. He played for Runcorn before joining Mossley. He was Mossley's leading scorer during the 1960–61 season, scoring 34 times. He left Mossley to rejoin Buxton.

References

1931 births
2014 deaths
Footballers from Glasgow
Scottish footballers
Rangers F.C. players
Bury F.C. players
Buxton F.C. players
Runcorn F.C. Halton players
Mossley A.F.C. players
English Football League players
Petershill F.C. players
Association football forwards